Willem Frederik "Wim" Slijkhuis (13 January 1923 – 28 June 2003) was a Dutch athlete. During his career that lasted from 1939 to 1954 he was a world's top middle distance runner, excelling in distances from 1500 to 5000 metres.

Slijkhuis began his international sports career shortly after World War II, having  competed nationally since 1939. In 1946, he won a silver medal in the 5000 m at the European Championships in Oslo.

Two years later he took part in the 1948 Summer Olympics in London, and was a favourite to win a medal. In the 5000 m he finished third, behind Belgian Gaston Reiff and the legendary Emil Zátopek; nevertheless Slijkhuis was not satisfied. In the 1500 m, his second event, he could have done better, but started his final sprint to the finish line too late to catch the two leading Swedes, who finished narrowly ahead of him. In spite of this, realising 3:50.4 he equalled his own Dutch record, set two years earlier. Slijkhuis' achievements were overshadowed, however, by the performances of compatriot Fanny Blankers-Koen, who won four gold medals at the same Olympics.

In 1950, Slijkhuis did win a major title: the 1500 m at the European championships held in Brussels, with a time of 3:47.2. His personal best at this distance had already been improved to 3:43.8, realised one year earlier in Antwerp and only 0.8 s away from the existing world record at the time.

During his career Willem Slijkhuis didn't just run almost everywhere in Europe, but also in New Zealand, South Africa and the United States. He was the first Dutchman who competed in the US Indoor circuit and the first non-American, who ever succeeded in obtaining the US title over one mile.

Owing to his stubborn behaviour Slijkhuis sometimes clashed with officials of the Dutch Athletics Federation, who he accused of outrageous interference. On the track however he impressed experts and public with his smooth, steady running style. Especially the English were delighted about his beautiful running style, which they lyrically described as "The Poetry of motion".

His second Olympic participation in the 1952 Summer Olympics ended without any successes. Slijkhuis, who won eleven national titles – including eight in the men's 5000 metres – on track, seven in Cross country running and set thirty Dutch records, ended his career in 1954 due to injuries. He died on 28 June 2003 in Badhoevedorp.

References

Notes 
 Weisscher, L. (1966) Wim Slijkhuis, een groot atleet. De Atletiekwereld nrs. 12 + 13: KNAU
 Bijkerk, T. (2004) Olympisch Oranje. De Vrieseborch 
 ARRS site

1923 births
2003 deaths
Dutch male middle-distance runners
Dutch male long-distance runners
Athletes (track and field) at the 1948 Summer Olympics
Athletes (track and field) at the 1952 Summer Olympics
European Athletics Championships medalists
Olympic athletes of the Netherlands
Olympic bronze medalists for the Netherlands
Sportspeople from Leiden
Medalists at the 1948 Summer Olympics
Olympic bronze medalists in athletics (track and field)
20th-century Dutch people
21st-century Dutch people